This is a list of 347 species in Bembix, a genus of sand wasps in the family Crabronidae.

Bembix species

 Bembix abercornensis Arnold, 1960 i c g
 Bembix abragensis Priesner, 1958 i c g
 Bembix admirabilis Radoszkowski, 1893 i c g
 Bembix affinis Dahlbom, 1844 i c g
 Bembix afra Handlirsch, 1893 i c g
 Bembix agrestis J. Parker, 1929 i c g
 Bembix alacris J. Parker, 1929 i c g
 Bembix albata J. Parker, 1929 i c g
 Bembix albicapilla Arnold, 1946 i c g
 Bembix albidula R. Turner, 1917 i c g
 Bembix albofasciata F. Smith, 1873 i c g
 Bembix aldabra J. Parker, 1929 c g
 Bembix alfierii Priesner, 1958 i c g
 Bembix allunga Evans and Matthews, 1973 i c g
 Bembix americana Fabricius, 1793 i c g b
 Bembix amoena Handlirsch, 1893 i c g b
 Bembix anomalipes Arnold, 1929 i c g
 Bembix antoni Krombein and van der Vecht, 1987 i c g
 Bembix arenaria Handlirsch, 1893 i c g
 Bembix arlettae de Beaumont, 1970 i c g
 Bembix arnoldi Arnold, 1929 i c g
 Bembix atra Kazenas, 1980 c g
 Bembix atrifrons F. Smith, 1856 i c g
 Bembix atrospinosa R. Turner, 1917 i c g
 Bembix aureofasciata R. Turner, 1910 i c g
 Bembix barbara Handlirsch, 1893 i c g
 Bembix baringa Evans and Matthews, 1973 i c g
 Bembix bataviana Strand, 1910 i c g
 Bembix baumanni Handlirsch, 1893 i c g
 Bembix bazilanensis Yasumatsu, 1933 i c g
 Bembix belfragei Cresson, 1873 i c g
 Bembix bellatrix J. Parker, 1929 i c g
 Bembix bequaerti Arnold, 1929 i c g
 Bembix berontha Evans and Matthews, 1973 i c g
 Bembix bicolor Radoszkowski, 1877 i c g
 Bembix bidentata Vander Linden, 1829 i c g
 Bembix boaliri Evans and Matthews, 1973 i c g
 Bembix boharti Griswold, 1983 i c g
 Bembix boonamin Evans and Matthews, 1973 i c g
 Bembix borneana Cameron, 1901 i c g
 Bembix borrei Handlirsch, 1893 i c g
 Bembix brachyptera Arnold, 1952 i c g
 Bembix braunsii Handlirsch, 1893 i c g
 Bembix brullei Guérin-Méneville, 1831 i c g
 Bembix brunneri Handlirsch, 1893 i c g
 Bembix bubalus Handlirsch, 1893 i c g
 Bembix budha Handlirsch, 1893 i c g
 Bembix buettikeri Guichard, 1989 i c g
 Bembix bulloni Giner Marí, 1945 i c g
 Bembix buntor Evans and Matthews, 1973 i c g
 Bembix burando Evans and Matthews, 1973 i c g
 Bembix burraburra Evans and Matthews, 1973 i c g
 Bembix cameroni Rohwer, 1912 i c g
 Bembix cameronis Handlirsch, 1893 i c g
 Bembix canescens (Gmelin, 1790) i c g
 Bembix capensis Lepeletier, 1845 i c g
 Bembix capicola Handlirsch, 1893 i c g
 Bembix carinata F. Smith, 1856 i c g
 Bembix carripan Evans and Matthews, 1973 i c g
 Bembix chlorotica Spinola, 1839 i c g
 Bembix chopardi Berland, 1950 i c g
 Bembix ciliciensis de Beaumont, 1967 i c g
 Bembix cinctella Handlirsch, 1893 i c g
 Bembix cinerea Handlirsch, 1893 i c g
 Bembix citripes Taschenberg, 1870 i c g
 Bembix clypealis Guichard, 1989 i c g
 Bembix comantis J. Parker, 1929 i c g
 Bembix compedita R. Turner, 1913 i c g
 Bembix cooba Evans and Matthews, 1973 i c g
 Bembix coonundura Evans and Matthews, 1973 i c g
 Bembix cultrifera Arnold, 1929 i c g
 Bembix cursitans Handlirsch, 1893 i c g
 Bembix dahlbomii Handlirsch, 1893 i c g
 Bembix denticauda Arnold, 1946 i c g
 Bembix dentilabris Handlirsch, 1893 i c g
 Bembix dilatata Radoszkowski, 1877 i c g
 Bembix diversidens Arnold, 1946 i c g
 Bembix diversipennis F. Smith, 1873 i c g
 Bembix diversipes F. Morawitz, 1889 i c g
 Bembix dubia Gussakovskij, 1933 c g
 Bembix eburnea Radoszkowski, 1877 i c g
 Bembix egens Handlirsch, 1893 i c g
 Bembix eleebana Evans and Matthews, 1973 i c g
 Bembix eucla Evans, 1990 i c g
 Bembix fantiorum Arnold, 1951 i c g
 Bembix filipina Lohrmann, 1942 i c g
 Bembix finschii Handlirsch, 1893 i c g
 Bembix fischeri Spinola, 1839 i c g
 Bembix fischeroides Magretti, 1892 i c g
 Bembix flavescens F. Smith, 1856 i c g
 Bembix flavicincta Turner, 1912 i c g
 Bembix flavifrons F. Smith, 1856 i c g
 Bembix flavipes F. Smith, 1856 i c g
 Bembix flaviventris F. Smith, 1873 i c g
 Bembix forcipata Handlirsch, 1893 i c g
 Bembix formosana Bischoff, 1913 i c g
 Bembix fossoria F. Smith, 1878 i c g
 Bembix fraudulenta Arnold, 1929 i c g
 Bembix freygessneri Morice, 1897 i c g
 Bembix frommeri R. Bohart, 1970 i c g
 Bembix frontalis Olivier, 1789 i c g
 Bembix fucosa J. Parker, 1929 i c g
 Bembix fumida J. Parker, 1929 i c g
 Bembix furcata Erichson, 1842 i c g
 Bembix fuscipennis Lepeletier, 1845 i c g
 Bembix galactina Dufour, 1854 i c g
 Bembix gazella Guichard, 1989 i c g
 Bembix gelane Evans and Matthews, 1973 i c g
 Bembix geneana A. Costa, 1867 i c g
 Bembix generosa J. Parker, 1929 i c g
 Bembix gillaspyi Evans and Matthews, 1968 i c g
 Bembix ginjulla Evans and Matthews, 1973 i c g
 Bembix glauca Fabricius, 1787 i c g
 Bembix gobiensis Tsuneki, 1971 c g
 Bembix goyarra Evans and Matthews, 1973 i c g
 Bembix gracilens J. Parker, 1929 i c g
 Bembix gracilis Handlirsch, 1893 c g
 Bembix grisescens Dahlbom, 1845 i c g
 Bembix gunamarra Evans and Matthews, 1973 i c g
 Bembix gurindji Evans, 1982 i c g
 Bembix hameri Guichard, 1989 i c g
 Bembix handlirschi Cameron, 1901 i c g
 Bembix harenarum Arnold, 1929 i c g
 Bembix hauseri Schmid-Egger, 2011 i c g
 Bembix hedickei Giner Marí, 1945 i c g
 Bembix hesione Bingham, 1893 i c g
 Bembix heteracantha Gussakovskij, 1933 i c g
 Bembix hexaspila J. Parker, 1929 i c g
 Bembix hinei J. Parker, 1917 i c g
 Bembix hofufensis Guichard, 1989 i c g
 Bembix hokarra Evans and Matthews, 1973 i c g
 Bembix holoni Bytinski-Salz, 1955 i c g
 Bembix hova de Saussure, 1892 i c g
 Bembix iliensis Kazenas, 1980 c g
 Bembix incognita J. Parker, 1929 i c g
 Bembix infumata Handlirsch, 1893 i c g
 Bembix inscripta Dahlbom, 1844 i c g
 Bembix integra Panzer, 1801 i c g
 Bembix inyoensis L. Kimsey and R. Kimsey, 1981 i c g
 Bembix irritata Nurse, 1903 i c g
 Bembix isabellae de Beaumont, 1970 i c g
 Bembix joeli Bytinski-Salz, 1955 i c g
 Bembix johnstoni R. Turner, 1912 i c g
 Bembix junodi Arnold, 1929 c g
 Bembix kamulla Evans and Matthews, 1973 i c g
 Bembix karooensis Gess, 1986 i c g
 Bembix kazakhstanica Kazenas, 1980 c g
 Bembix kirgisica F. Morawitz, 1891 c g
 Bembix kohlii Morice, 1897 i c g
 Bembix kora Evans and Matthews, 1973 i c g
 Bembix kriechbaumeri Handlirsch, 1893 i c g
 Bembix kununurra Evans and Matthews, 1973 i c g
 Bembix labiata Fabricius, 1798 i c g
 Bembix labidura Handlirsch, 1893 i c g
 Bembix lactea Cameron, 1901 i c g
 Bembix laeta J. Parker, 1929 i c g
 Bembix lamellata Handlirsch, 1893 i c g
 Bembix latebrosa Kohl, 1909 i c g
 Bembix latifasciata R. Turner, 1912 i c g
 Bembix latigenata Willink, 1947 i c g
 Bembix latitarsis Handlirsch, 1893 i c g
 Bembix leeuwinensis R. Turner, 1915 i c g
 Bembix levis J. Parker, 1929 i c g
 Bembix liberiensis J. Parker, 1929 i c g
 Bembix lineatifrons Cameron, 1908 i c g
 Bembix littoralis R. Turner, 1908 i c g
 Bembix liturata R. Turner, 1917 i c g
 Bembix liventis J. Parker, 1929 i c g
 Bembix lobatifrons R. Turner, 1913 i c g
 Bembix lobimana Handlirsch, 1893 i c g
 Bembix longipennis J. Parker, 1929 i c g
 Bembix loorea Evans and Matthews, 1973 i c g
 Bembix loupata J. Parker, 1929 i c g
 Bembix lunata Fabricius, 1793 i c g
 Bembix lusca Spinola, 1839 i c g
 Bembix lutescens Radoszkowski, 1877 i c g
 Bembix luzonensis J. Parker, 1929 i c g
 Bembix madecassa de Saussure, 1890 i c g
 Bembix magarra Evans and Matthews, 1973 i c g
 Bembix magdalenae C. Fox, 1926 i c g
 Bembix maidli von Schulthess, 1927 i c g
 Bembix maldivensis Cameron, 1901 i c g
 Bembix maliki Evans and Matthews, 1973 i c g
 Bembix mareeba Evans and Matthews, 1973 i c g
 Bembix marhra Evans and Matthews, 1973 i c g
 Bembix marsupiata Handlirsch, 1893 i c g
 Bembix massaica Cameron, 1908 i c g
 Bembix megadonta Cameron, 1904 i c g
 Bembix megerlei Dahlbom, 1845 i c g
 Bembix melanaspis J. Parker, 1917 i c g
 Bembix melancholica F. Smith, 1856 i c g
 Bembix melanopa Handlirsch, 1893 i c g
 Bembix melanura F. Morawitz, 1889 c g
 Bembix merceti J. Parker, 1929 i c g
 Bembix mianga Evans and Matthews, 1973 i c g
 Bembix mildei Dahlbom, 1845 i c g
 Bembix mima Handlirsch, 1893 i c g
 Bembix mindanaonis Tsuneki, 1992 i c g
 Bembix minya Evans and Matthews, 1973 i c g
 Bembix modesta Handlirsch, 1893 i c g
 Bembix moebii Handlirsch, 1893 i c g
 Bembix mokari Evans and Matthews, 1973 i c g
 Bembix moma Evans and Matthews, 1973 i c g
 Bembix monedula Handlirsch, 1893 i c g
 Bembix moonga Evans and Matthews, 1973 i c g
 Bembix multipicta F. Smith, 1873 i c g
 Bembix mundurra Evans and Matthews, 1973 i c g
 Bembix munta Evans and Matthews, 1973 i c g
 Bembix musca Handlirsch, 1893 i c g
 Bembix namibensis Gess, 1986 i c g
 Bembix nasuta Morice, 1897 c g
 Bembix nigrispina Guichard, 1989 i c g
 Bembix nigrocornuta J. Parker, 1929 c g
 Bembix nigropectinata R. Turner, 1936 i c g
 Bembix nilotica Priesner, 1958 i c g
 Bembix niponica F. Smith, 1873 i c g
 Bembix notabilis Arnold, 1952 i c g
 Bembix nubilipennis Cresson, 1873 i c g
 Bembix nupera J. Parker, 1929 i c g
 Bembix obiri Evans, 1982 i c g
 Bembix obtusa R. Turner, 1917 i c g
 Bembix occidentalis W. Fox, 1893 i c g b
 Bembix ochracea Handlirsch, 1893 i c g
 Bembix octosetosa Lohrmann, 1942 i c g
 Bembix oculata Panzer, 1801 i c g
 Bembix odontopyga R. Turner, 1917 i c g
 Bembix olba Evans and Matthews, 1973 i c g
 Bembix olivacea Fabricius, 1787 i c g
 Bembix olivata Dahlbom, 1845 i c g
 Bembix omanensis Guichard, 1989 i c g
 Bembix oomborra Evans and Matthews, 1973 i c g
 Bembix opinabilis J. Parker, 1929 i c g
 Bembix orientalis Handlirsch, 1893 i c g
 Bembix ornatilabiata Cameron, 1908 i c g
 Bembix ourapilla Evans and Matthews, 1973 i c g
 Bembix ovans Bingham, 1893 i c g
 Bembix palaestinensis Lohrmann, 1942 i c g
 Bembix pallescens Priesner, 1958 i c g
 Bembix pallida Radoszkowski, 1877 i c g
 Bembix pallidipicta F. Smith, 1873 i c g
 Bembix palmata F. Smith, 1856 i c g
 Bembix palona Evans and Matthews, 1973 i c g
 Bembix papua Handlirsch, 1893 i c g
 Bembix parkeri Lohrmann, 1942 i c g
 Bembix parvula F. Morawitz, 1897 c g
 Bembix pectinipes Handlirsch, 1893 i c g
 Bembix persa von Schulthess, 1927 i c g
 Bembix persimilis R. Turner, 1917 i c g
 Bembix physopoda Handlirsch, 1893 i c g
 Bembix pikati Evans and Matthews, 1973 i c g
 Bembix pillara Evans and Matthews, 1973 i c g
 Bembix pinguis Handlirsch, 1893 i c g
 Bembix piraporae J. Parker, 1929 i c g
 Bembix placida F. Smith, 1856 i c g
 Bembix planifrons F. Morawitz, 1891 i c g
 Bembix portchinskii Radoszkowski, 1884 i c g
 Bembix priesneri de Beaumont, 1966 i c g
 Bembix promontorii Lohrmann, 1942 i c g
 Bembix pugillatrix Handlirsch, 1893 i c g
 Bembix pulka Evans and Matthews, 1973 i c g
 Bembix quadrimaculata Taschenberg, 1870 i c g
 Bembix quinquespinosa J. Parker, 1929 i c g
 Bembix radoszkowskyi Handlirsch, 1893 i c g
 Bembix rava Arnold, 1952 i c g
 Bembix recurva J. Parker, 1929 i c g
 Bembix refuscata J. Parker, 1929 i c g
 Bembix regia J. Parker, 1929 i c g
 Bembix regnata J. Parker, 1929 i c g
 Bembix relegata R. Turner, 1917 i c g
 Bembix residua J. Parker, 1929 i c g
 Bembix robusta Lohrmann, 1942 i c g
 Bembix rochei Guichard, 1989 i c g
 Bembix rostrata (Linnaeus, 1758) i c g
 Bembix rufiventris Priesner, 1958 i c g
 Bembix rugosa J. Parker, 1917 i c g
 Bembix saadensis Guichard, 1989 i c g
 Bembix salina Lohrmann, 1942 i c g
 Bembix saudi Guichard, 1989 i c g
 Bembix sayi Cresson, 1865 i c g b
 Bembix scaura Arnold, 1929 i c g
 Bembix scotti R. Turner, 1912 i c g
 Bembix seculata J. Parker, 1929 i c g
 Bembix semoni Cameron, 1905 i c g
 Bembix severa F. Smith, 1873 i c g
 Bembix sibilans Handlirsch, 1893 i c g
 Bembix silvestrii Maidl, 1914 i c g
 Bembix sinuata Panzer, 1804 i c g
 Bembix smithii Handlirsch, 1893 i c g
 Bembix spatulata J. Parker, 1929 i c g
 Bembix spiritalis J. Parker, 1929 i c g
 Bembix splendida Arnold, 1951 i c g
 Bembix stadelmanni Handlirsch, 1893 i c g
 Bembix stenebdoma J. Parker, 1917 c g
 Bembix stenobdoma J. Parker, 1917 i
 Bembix subeburnea Tsuneki, 1971 c g
 Bembix sulphurescens Dahlbom, 1844 i c g
 Bembix tadzhika Kazenas, 1980 i c g
 Bembix taiwana Bischoff, 1913 i c g
 Bembix tangadee Evans, 1990 i c g
 Bembix tarsata Latreille, 1809 i c g
 Bembix taschenbergi Handlirsch, 1893 i c g
 Bembix tenuifasciata J. Parker, 1929 i c g
 Bembix texana Cresson, 1873 i c g b
 Bembix thooma Evans and Matthews, 1973 i c g
 Bembix tibooburra Evans and Matthews, 1973 i c g
 Bembix torosa J. Parker, 1929 i c g
 Bembix tranquebarica (Gmelin, 1790) i c g
 Bembix transcaspica Radoszkowski, 1893 i c g
 Bembix trepida Handlirsch, 1893 i c g
 Bembix triangulifera Arnold, 1944 i c g
 Bembix tricolor Dahlbom, 1844 i c g
 Bembix trimaculata Kazenas, 1980 c g
 Bembix troglodytes Handlirsch, 1893 i c g
 Bembix truncata Handlirsch, 1893 i c g
 Bembix tuberculiventris R. Turner, 1908 i c g
 Bembix turca Dahlbom, 1845 i c g
 Bembix ugandensis R. Turner, 1913 i c g
 Bembix uloola Evans and Matthews, 1973 i c g
 Bembix ulula Arnold, 1929 i c g
 Bembix undeneya Evans and Matthews, 1973 i c g
 Bembix undulata Spinola, 1839 i c g
 Bembix usheri Arnold, 1960 i c g
 Bembix variabilis F. Smith, 1856 i c g
 Bembix vasta Lohrmann, 1942 i c g
 Bembix velox Handlirsch, 1893 i c g
 Bembix venusta Arnold, 1929 i c g
 Bembix versuta Arnold, 1946 i c g
 Bembix vespiformis F. Smith, 1856 i c g
 Bembix wadamiri Evans and Matthews, 1973 i c g
 Bembix wagleri Gistel, 1857 i c g
 Bembix wangoola Evans and Matthews, 1973 i c g
 Bembix wanna Evans and Matthews, 1973 i c g
 Bembix warawara Evans and Matthews, 1973 i c g
 Bembix weberi Handlirsch, 1893 c g
 Bembix weema Evans and Matthews, 1973 i c g
 Bembix westermanni Spinola, 1839 i c g
 Bembix westonii Bingham, 1894 i c g
 Bembix wilcannia Evans and Matthews, 1973 i c g
 Bembix wiluna Evans and Matthews, 1973 i c g
 Bembix wollowra Evans and Matthews, 1973 i c g
 Bembix wolpa Evans and Matthews, 1973 i c g
 Bembix wowine Evans and Matthews, 1973 i c g
 Bembix yalta Evans and Matthews, 1973 i c g
 Bembix yunkara Evans and Matthews, 1973 i c g
 Bembix zarudnyi Gussakovskij, 1933 i c g
 Bembix zinni Gess, 1986 i c g
 Bembix zonata Klug, 1835 i c g

Data sources: i = ITIS, c = Catalogue of Life, g = GBIF, b = Bugguide.net

References

Bembix